Georgia International Plaza is a  green space atop a 2,000-space parking garage in Downtown Atlanta, between the Georgia Dome on the west, the Georgia World Congress Center on the north, Philips Arena on the east and  In March 1994 the Georgia General Assembly approved $28 million to build the park. The public artwork Flair Across America is located in the park.

References

Parks in Atlanta